The distribution of white South Africans is fairly evenly spread. They currently make up 7.7% of the total population and are around 4.5–5 million. They are found in large numbers in practically every province in South Africa but always as a minority. They are high in concentration in large cities.

Historically, in the pre-1994 provinces, the Transvaal and Orange Free State were predominantly Afrikaans-speaking, Natal was mostly English-speaking and the Cape Province was largely mixed.

By province
Afrikaners are located in all parts of the nation, but in the former homelands such as Transkei and Natal, they are very few. English-speaking whites are generally concentrated in KwaZulu-Natal, Gauteng and in major settlements in the Western and Eastern Cape. Other white groups (such as Portuguese and Germans) live mostly in Johannesburg or Cape Town. In the former homelands, the white populations are so tiny that even the slightest population can affect the percentages speaking Afrikaans or English. Of the largest cities in the country, Johannesburg, Durban, East London and Pietermaritzburg are largely English-speaking in the core, and Pretoria, Cape Town, Bloemfontein, Kimberley, Polokwane, Nelspruit, Witbank and Rustenburg are predominantly Afrikaans-speaking. Port Elizabeth is largely mixed.

Eastern Cape
The Eastern Cape has one of the lowest percentages of whites in South Africa, which is around 4.7%. They number just above 300,000. Similarly to the Limpopo Province, whites as a percent of the population varies around the Eastern Cape. The East, where the former black designated homelands of Transkei and Ciskei are found, have a high density of black people and only a small number of whites. For example, in the OR Tambo District Municipality, located in the former Transkei, only 0.1% of the 1.6 million inhabitants are white. On the other hand, in the west, Local Municipalities such as in the Cacadu District Municipality, contain white percentages exceeding 10%, with the highest being the Kouga Local Municipality, which stands at 25.4%. The largest white population centre is Port Elizabeth, which houses over half (170,000) of the Eastern Cape's white population. Other major white populations exist in East London, Grahamstown, Graaff-Reinet, and a number of smaller towns. The Eastern Cape has the most equal mix of both English- and Afrikaans-speaking whites. The geographic background of the province shows a mix of English and Afrikaans placenames, with no clear distinction between where Afrikaans- or English-speakers live.

Free State
The Afrikaaners far outnumber English-speaking white people in the Free State (formerly called the Orange Free State) because British immigration to the region was very limited. The Afrikaaners are predominant in practically all cities and in many farms and have the largest population is around Bloemfontein, which holds an estimated 100,000 white people (or a third of the total in the province). The white percentage has recently rebounded after a prolonged decline. In 1880, white were 45.7% of the population, and that had declined to 36.8% in 1904. Despite a long and steady decline throughout the 20th century, the 2007 Community Survey showed whites of the Free State had increased from 8.8% to 9.6%. There could be issues with that figure as overall, the population of some municipalities decreased in population by up to 50%, which meant that the "missing" black people counted resulted in an increased white percentage. Major white populations are also found in cities such as Welkom, Kroonstad and Sasolburg.

Gauteng
Gauteng has a higher percentage (18.4%) and number (just under 2 million) of whites than any other provinces. Afrikaner whites tend to be gathered in and around Pretoria (with around 450,000 Afrikaners), the East and West Rand, and in many other cities and towns in Gauteng. English-speaking white South Africans are mostly found in central Gauteng: Johannesburg and the East Rand. Also, the Midvaal Local Municipality, in Gauteng, contains one of the highest percentage of whites in the country, which in 2007 stood at 35%.

KwaZulu-Natal
KwaZulu-Natal is the only province in which the vast majority of white people are English-speaking. However, some towns remain in the north with large Afrikaner populations such as in the town of Vryheid. Before 1994, the province was called Natal, and in the 1960 republic referendum, it was the only province to vote against severing links to the British Crown. KwaZulu-Natal, like most other provinces, has experienced a both numerical and proportional decline in the white population. Over half of KwaZulu-Natal's white population lives in Durban and its surrounding suburbs.

Limpopo
The Limpopo Province has a smaller percentage of white people than any other province in the country, which in 2007 stood at 2.2%. Almost entirely Afrikaners, the white population is very unevenly spread. Some municipalities, especially in the more lightly-populated west, have white percentages reaching far beyond 10% such as the Thabazimbi (23%), Bela-Bela (13%) and Mookgopong Local Municipality (21%). Conversely, in the much more densely populated east, with the former homelands of Gazankulu, Lebowa and Venda, the white percentage drops significantly because of the high black population density. Some municipalities, including the Thumamela and Mutale Local Municipality, have white populations of no more than 500 and so have percentages reaching as low as 0.05%. The capital city, Polokwane (formerly Pietersburg), holds around 27,000 whites, making up just under a fourth of the province's white population. Other major white concentrations are in Tzaneen, Phalaborwa, Thabazimbi, Louis Trichardt and practically every settlement along the N1 national road.

Mpumalanga
In 2007 roughly 6.7% of Mpumalanga was white, mostly Afrikaans-speaking. Approximately 250,000 whites live in Mpumalanga, with major population centres being the capital, Nelspruit, and other large cities such as Witbank, Middelburg, Ermelo and Lydenburg.

Northwest Province
The Northwest Province has a situation that is almost identical to that of Mpumalanga. There is a very strong and patriotic Afrikaner community in the province, which is also the birthplace of the Afrikaner Weerstandsbeweging (AWB), which was created in Ventersdorp. There is an especially strong Afrikaner influence in the city of Potchefstroom. In 2007, there were 235,580 whites, making up roughly 7.2% (up from 6.7% in 2001) of the province's total population. The vast majority are Afrikaans-speaking.

Northern Cape
The Northern Cape's small white population is also dominated by Afrikaners, with some English-speaking whites in cities such as Kimberley. The white population is no more than 100,000, but because the province is very sparsely populated, the white population has thus remained very much above 10%, even since 1994. Roughly 25% of whites live in the Sol Plaatje Local Municipality, which contains the Diamond-mining city of Kimberley. Although it has only about 12,000 white inhabitants, the Namakwa District Municipality, in the very sparsely-ppopulated western Northern Cape, they still manage to make up over 11% of the District Municipality's population. Afrikaans is the lingua franca in the Northern Cape because the majority of the province's population (mostly Coloureds) speak it as a first language. Only the north-eastern areas have more blacks than Coloureds and as well as far fewer white people. Besides Kimberley, other important white concentrations are found in Upington, Britstown, Springbok, De Aar, Jan Kempdorp and Barkly West. Orania, a purpose-built town for Afrikaans-speaking whites, is also in the east of the Northern Cape, bordering the Free State. It houses just over 2,000 inhabitants and is a special case as it is the only "main-place" in which virtually all inhabitants are white.

Western Cape

The Western Cape has the second-highest percentage of white people (18.4%) in South Africa, at 850,000 and the only one with a white premier (governor). The lingua franca is Afrikaans, but some urban areas, especially Cape Town, have a large English-speaking population. Many Cape Town suburbs and neighbourhoods have white majorities, including some with a white population of at least 95%, such as Llandudno, Fish Hoek, Constantia and Noordhoek. The Western Cape has some of the highest white percentage municipalities in South Africa, such as the Overstrand (33%), Cape Agulhas (23%), Mossel Bay (28%), Knysna (23%) and Hessequa (38%).

Largest population centres 
This is a list of the "main places" (localities) in South Africa with a white population of more than 10,000, with data taken from the 2011 census.

Largest populations by province 
The following lists show the "main places" with the largest white populations in each province, with data taken from the 2011 census.

Eastern Cape 
The results of the 2011 census showed an Eastern Cape white population of 310,450, a slight increase on the 304,342 recorded in 2007 and the 305,839 recorded in 2001, but a decrease from the 330,300 counted in 1996. 

The 50 main places with a population of more than 300 white persons in 2011 are listed below: (Although population figures are shown for both 2001 and 2011, these numbers are not necessarily directly comparable due to numerous changes in administrative boundaries.)

Free State 
The results of the 2011 census showed a white population of 239,026 in the Free State, a decrease from the 266,555 recorded in 2007. There were 238,789 in 2001 and 316,459 in 1996.

Just over a third (34.4%) of the white population lived in the Mangaung Metropolitan Municipality around Bloemfontein at the time of the 2011 census. The Matjhabeng and Metsimaholo local municipalities around Welkom and Sasolburg comprise about a sixth (16.6%) and a tenth (10.2%) respectively, while much of the white population resides in numerous small towns.

The 53 main places with a 2011 population of more than 360 white persons are listed below: (Although population figures are shown for both 2001 and 2011, these numbers are not necessarily directly comparable due to numerous changes in administrative boundaries.)

Gauteng 
The results of the 2011 census showed a Gauteng white population of 1,913,884, a slight decrease from the 1,923,829 recorded in 2007 but an increase from 1,735,094 in 2001 and 1,702,343 in 1996.
 
Just over 85% of the Gauteng white population live in one of the three Metropolitan Municipalities of Tshwane (30.6%), Johannesburg (28.4%) and Ekurhuleni (26.3%).

The 65 main places with a 2011 population of more than 550 white persons are listed below: (Although population figures are shown for both 2001 and 2011, these numbers are not necessarily directly comparable due to numerous changes in administrative boundaries.)

Notes

KwaZulu Natal 
 
The 62 main places with a population of more than 340 white persons in 2011 are listed below: (Although population figures are shown for both 2001 and 2011, these numbers are not necessarily directly comparable due to numerous changes in administrative boundaries.)

Limpopo

The results of the 2011 census showed Limpopo's white population being 139,359; an increase of 5.2% from 132,420 in 2001. The white population was recorded as 2.6% of the total population, the lowest share of the population in any province and a 0.1% decrease from 2001.
Almost a quarter (23.6%) of the mostly-rural white population reside in Polokwane Local Municipality. 

The 27 main places with a 2011 population of more than 400 white persons are listed below:
(Although population figures are shown for both 2001 and 2011, these numbers are not necessarily directly comparable due to numerous changes in administrative boundaries.)

Mpumalanga

The 59 main places with a 2011 population of more than 200 white persons are listed below: (Although population figures are shown for both 2001 and 2011, these numbers are not necessarily directly comparable due to numerous changes in administrative boundaries.)

North West

The 42 main places with a 2011 population of more than 300 white persons are listed below: 
(Although population figures are shown for both 2001 and 2011, these numbers are not necessarily directly comparable due to numerous changes in administrative boundaries.)

Northern Cape 
The results of the 2011 census showed a Northern Cape white population of 81,246, a decrease of 20.8% on the 102,519 recorded in 2001. 
The white population grew in absolute terms the most in Kathu, Kuruman and Orania. During the same period, the white population in Kimberley, Upington and Warrenton declined the most in absolute terms. 

The 34 main places with a 2011 population of more than 300 white persons are listed below: (Although population figures are shown for both 2001 and 2011, these numbers are not necessarily directly comparable due to numerous changes in administrative boundaries.)

Western Cape 

The 120 main places with a 2011 population of more than 400 white persons are listed below: (Although population figures are shown for both 2001 and 2011, these numbers are not necessarily directly comparable due to numerous changes in administrative boundaries.)

See also
Afrikaans-speaking population of South Africa
Ethnic groups in South Africa by municipality
White demographic decline

References

 
Society of South Africa